The Great Problem is a 1916 American silent drama film directed by Rex Ingram and starring Violet Mersereau, Dan Hanlon and Lionel Adams. It marked Ingram's directorial debut of a feature film, having previously made a short. It was shot at Fort Lee in New Jersey. A complete copy of the film is held by the Museum of Modern Art.

Cast
 Violet Mersereau as Peggy Carson 
 Dan Hanlon as Bill Carson 
 Lionel Adams as George Devereaux 
 Kittens Reichert as Peggy - as a child 
 William J. Dyer as Skinny McGee 
 Mathilde Brundage as Mrs. Devereaux 
 Howard Crampton as Joseph

References

Bibliography
 Leonhard Gmür. Rex Ingram: Hollywood's Rebel of the Silver Screen. 2013.

External links
 

1916 films
1916 drama films
1910s English-language films
American silent feature films
Silent American drama films
Films directed by Rex Ingram
American black-and-white films
Universal Pictures films
Films shot in Fort Lee, New Jersey
1910s American films